The Malandain Ballet Biarritz was created in 1998 in Biarritz. It is one of 19 National Choreographic Centers (Centres Chorégraphiques Nationaux) in France. The Malandain Ballet Biarritz is directed by its choreographer Thierry Malandain, has 22 dancers, and focuses on contemporary ballet and neoclassical ballet. Since its creation, the Malandain Ballet Biarritz has been located in the Gare du Midi of Biarritz, a former railway station that has been transformed into a theater.

Repertoire 
 2017 
 2016 
 2015 Beauty and the Beast / Tchaikovsky
 2014 Estro / Vivaldi
 2014 Nocturnes / Chopin
 2013 Cinderella / Prokofiev
 2012 Silhouette / Beethoven
 2012 Last Song / French traditional songs / received on 14 June 2012 the Syndicat de la Critique's main prize
 2011 Lucifer / Connesson
 2010 Roméo et Juliette / Berlioz
 2009 Magifique / Tchaikovsky
 2008 Le Portrait de l'infante / Ravel
 2008 L'Amour sorcier / De Falla
 2006 Don Juan / Gluck
 2005 Les petits riens / Mozart
 2004 Sang des étoiles / Mahler, Waldteufel, Strauss, Minkus
 2003 Cigale / Massenet
 2003 Les créatures / Beethoven
 2002 La mort du cygne / Saint-Saëns
 2002 Le Biches / Poulenc
 2001 Fleur de pierre / Prokofiev
 2001 Boléro / Ravel
 2001 Spectre de la rose / von Weber
 2000 Chambre d’amour / Cabalette
 1999 Le Carillon / Massenet
 1999 Le Cid / Massenet
 1998 Perre de lune / Britten
 1998 Ouverture Cubaine / Gershwin

See also

References

External links
 

Ballet companies in France
Biarritz